Syed Azeez Pasha, a politician from Communist Party of India, was a Member of the Parliament of India representing Andhra Pradesh in the Rajya Sabha, the upper house of the Parliament from 3 April 2006 to 2 April 2012.

References

External links
 Profile on Rajya Sabha website

Communist Party of India politicians from Andhra Pradesh
Rajya Sabha members from Andhra Pradesh
Living people
Telugu politicians
Year of birth missing (living people)